The Braindead Megaphone is George Saunders’s first full-length essay collection, published in 2007; it is 272 pages long. The collection has many essays that appeared in The New Yorker and GQ.

Contents
 "The Braindead Megaphone"
 "The New Mecca" (originally published in GQ)
 "Thank You, Esther Forbes"
 "A Survey of the Literature" (originally published in The New Yorker, 2003)
 "Mr. Vonnegut in Sumatra"
 "A Brief Study of the British"
 "Nostalgia" (originally published in The New Yorker, 2006)
 "Ask the Optimist!" (originally published in The New Yorker, 2006)
 "Proclamation," (originally published in The New Yorker, 2006)
 "Woof: A Plea of Sorts"
 "The Great Divider"
 "Thought Experiment" (originally published as "Advice from an Old Fart, in the Form of a Thought Experiment" in Take My Advice, edited by James L. Harmon, 2002)
 "The Perfect Gerbil: Reading Barthelme's 'The School'"
 "The United States of Huck: Introduction to Adventures of Huckleberry Finn (introduction to The Adventures of Huckleberry Finn, 2001.)
 "Buddha Boy" (originally published as "The Incredible Buddha Boy," GQ, 2007).
 "Manifesto: A Press Release from PRKA" (originally published on Slate.com, 2004).

External links
George Saunders Land: Bibliography

2007 non-fiction books
Essay collections